Annabel Morwenna Vernon (born 1 September 1982) is a retired British rower.

She was born in Truro, Cornwall. She was educated at St Minver Primary School then Wadebridge School, Downing College, Cambridge, and King's College London (MA International Relations).

Vernon started rowing at Castle Dore Rowing Club at Golant in Cornwall when she was 17, influenced by her elder brother and father. She read history at Downing College, Cambridge, where she rowed in the women's Blue Boat in 2003, under the presidency of Ruth de Las Casas. She was a member of Rob Roy Boat Club while in Cambridge, then represented Thames Rowing Club and now rows under Marlow Rowing Club colours.

She represented Great Britain in the Women's Quadruple Sculls at the 2008 Beijing Olympics, winning a silver medal. She was selected to row in the women's eight at the 2012 Summer Olympics. The crew reached the A Final of the event, and finished fifth.

After retiring from active competition she embarked on a journalistic, media and speaking career.

In 2019 she published her first book, Mind Games, with Bloomsbury Publishing, which looks at the psychology of elite sport through a mixture of academic theories and interviews with sports people.

Achievements
 Bronze medal in the pair at the World U23 Championships in Poznań.
 Sixth in the women's single at the 2006 GB Senior Selection Trials in Belgium.

World Championships 2005
 Ninth in the single scull.

2006 World Cup Series
 Gold in the Double Scull at the Munich World Cup Regatta.
 Fourth in Poznań.
 Silver in Lucerne.

World Championships 2006
 Fourth in the Double Scull.

World Championships 2007
 Gold in the Quad Scull

Beijing Olympics 2008
 Silver in the Quad Scull.

World Championships 2009
 Silver in the Double Scull

World Championships 2010
 Gold in the Quad Scull

References

External links

 Official website
 
 
 
 
 

1982 births
British female rowers
People from Wadebridge
Living people
Alumni of Downing College, Cambridge
Alumni of King's College London
Olympic rowers of Great Britain
Olympic silver medallists for Great Britain
Rowers at the 2008 Summer Olympics
Rowers at the 2012 Summer Olympics
Sportspeople from Truro
Olympic medalists in rowing
English female rowers
Medalists at the 2008 Summer Olympics
World Rowing Championships medalists for Great Britain